Born to Be Blue! is an album by American jazz pianist Bobby Timmons recorded in 1963 and released on the Riverside label.

Reception
The Allmusic review by Scott Yanow awarded the album 4 stars stating: "This is excellent music but unfortunately Timmons would not grow much musically after this period".

Track listing
All compositions by Bobby Timmons except as indicated
 "Born to Be Blue" (Mel Torme, Robert Wells) - 4:23
 "Malice Towards None" (Tom McIntosh) - 4:55
 "Sometimes I Feel Like a Motherless Child" (Traditional) - 4:40
 "Know Not One" - 7:52
 "The Sit-In" - 4:15
 "Namely You" (Gene de Paul, Johnny Mercer) - 6:01
 "Often Annie" - 9:16
Recorded in New York City on August 12, 1963 (tracks 3, 4 & 6) and September 10, 1963 (tracks 1, 2, 5, & 7).

Personnel
Bobby Timmons - piano
Ron Carter (tracks 3, 4 & 6), Sam Jones (tracks 1, 2, 5, & 7) - bass
Connie Kay - drums

References

Riverside Records albums
Bobby Timmons albums
1963 albums
Albums produced by Orrin Keepnews